The American Enterprise (TAE) was a public policy magazine published by the American Enterprise Institute in Washington, D.C. Its editorial stance was politically conservative, generally advocating free-market economics and a neoconservative U.S. foreign policy.

The magazine was published approximately eight times per year. In addition to the content published in its print version, the magazine's Web site included articles and opinion pieces published under the name TAE Daily.

Combining several American Enterprise Institute (AEI) publications, TAE was founded by Karlyn Bowman, then known as Karlyn Keene, in 1990. The AEI Economist became the new magazine's "The Washington Economist" column, written by Herbert Stein. Bowman and Everett Carll Ladd compiled "Public Opinion and Demographic Report," a twenty-four page selection of polling data that offered a condensed version of Public Opinion. TAE'''s second editor, from 1995 to 2006, was Karl Zinsmeister. When he left to join the Bush White House, the magazine was shuttered. It was replaced in 2006 by a new publication, The American''.

External links
 "The American Enterprise Online," as stored in the Internet Archive

1990 establishments in Washington, D.C.
2006 disestablishments in Washington, D.C.
Conservative magazines published in the United States
Defunct political magazines published in the United States
Eight times annually magazines published in the United States
Magazines established in 1990
Magazines disestablished in 2006
Magazines published in Washington, D.C.